The New World Order is a New York Times best-selling book authored by Pat Robertson, published in 1991 by Word Publishing. In the book, Robertson purports to expose a behind-the-scenes Establishment with enormous power controlling American policy, whose "principal goal is the establishment of a one-world government where the control of money is in the hands of one or more privately owned but government-chartered central banks." This conspiracy includes such elements as the Illuminati, the New Age movement, the Freemasons, the Council on Foreign Relations, and the Trilateral Commission. Robertson further claims that the rise of this one-world conspiracy is being guided by Satan to fulfill the predictions of premillennial Christian eschatology, viewing it as a sign that the end times are nearing.

Reviews 

In a critical review of this book, Ephraim Radner wrote, "Lind and Heilbrun show how Robertson took over—in some cases word for word—well-worn theories of a Jewish conspiracy. In particular, Robertson relied on the work of Nesta Webster and Eustace Mullins." Robertson's work was described as a "catch all for conspiracy theories" by the Christian academic Don Wilkey: "A summary of Robertson’s book is found on page 177 in which Pat says a conspiracy has existed in the world working through Freemasonry and a secret Order of the Illuminati, a group combining Masons and Jewish Bankers."

See also 
 New World Order (conspiracy theory)
 New world order (politics)

References 

1991 non-fiction books
Books about conspiracy theories